Tullio Pinelli (24 June 1908 – 7 March 2009) was an Italian screenwriter known for his work on the Federico Fellini films I Vitelloni, La Strada, La Dolce Vita and 8½.

Biography
Born in Turin, Piedmont, Italy, Pinelli began his career as a civil lawyer but spent his free time working in the theatre as a playwright. He was descended from a long line of Italian patriots; his great-uncle General Ferdinando Pinelli quashed the bandit revolt in Calabria following Italian unification.

He met Fellini in a Rome kiosk in 1946 while they were reading opposite pages of the same newspaper. "Meeting each other", explained Pinelli, "was a creative lightning bolt. We spoke the same language from the start... We were fantasizing about a screenplay that would be the exact opposite of what was fashionable then: the story of a very shy and modest office worker who discovered he can fly; so he flaps his arms and escapes out the window. It certainly wasn't Italian neorealism. But the idea never went anywhere either." The anecdote about flying presages the opening scene of 8½ (1963) in which the protagonist, a prominent film director, who dreams of escape by flying out of his car caught in a traffic jam.

Pinelli died at the age of 100 on 7 March 2009 in Rome. He was married (from 1988) to the French-born actress Madeleine Lebeau, who had roles in 8½ and Casablanca (1942).

Selected filmography
 The Opium Den (1947)
 Symphony of Love (1954)
 The Lovers of Manon Lescaut (1954)
 Mano rubata (1989)

References

Bibliography 
 Pinelli, Tullio (2008). L'uomo a cavallo. Roma: Edizioni Sabinae.

External links

1908 births
2009 deaths
Italian centenarians
Men centenarians
David di Donatello winners
David di Donatello Career Award winners